Omega Glacier is a glacier flowing to the coast just south of Cape Omega in Queen Maud Land. Mapped from surveys and air photos by Japanese Antarctic Research Expedition (JARE), 1957–62, who gave the name.

See also
 Glaciology
 Kingyo Rock, large linear rock at the south side of Omega Glacier
 List of glaciers in the Antarctic

References

External links

Glaciers of Queen Maud Land
Prince Olav Coast